The Ciorbea Cabinet was the 112th cabinet of Romania, formed 12 December 1996 and dissolved 30 March 1998, with Victor Ciorbea as head of government. It was a coalition cabinet formed between the winner of the elections, CDR (Convenția Democrată Română, the Romanian Democratic Convention, which included PNȚCD, PNL, PER), USD (Uniunea Social Democrată, the Social Democratic Union, which included PD and PSDR), and UDMR.

Members

Prime Minister: 
Victor Ciorbea

Ministers of State:
Mircea Ciumara
Ulm Spineanu
Gavril Dejeu
Adrian Severin
Victor Babiuc
Călin Popescu-Tăriceanu
Valeriu Stoica
Alexandru Athanasiu

Ministers:
Valeriu Stoica (Justice)
Victor Babiuc/Constantin Dudu Ionescu (Defense)
Mircea Ciumara/Daniel Dăianu (Finance)
Ion Caramitru (Culture)
Nicolae Noica (Public Works)
Dinu Gavrilescu (Agriculture)
Ștefan Iosif Drăgulescu/Ion Victor Bruckner (Health)
Adrian Severin/Andrei Pleșu (Foreign Affairs)
Călin Popescu-Tăriceanu/Mircea Ciumara (Industry and Commerce)
Alexandru Athanasiu (Labor)
Sorin Pantiș (Communications)
Ioan Oltean/Sorin Frunzăverde/Romică Tomescu (Environment)
Traian Băsescu/Anton Ionescu (Transport)
Gavril Dejeu (Interior)
Virgil Petrescu/Andrei Marga (Education)
Ulm Spineanu/Ilie Șerbănescu (Reform)
Bujor Bogdan Teodoriu/Horia Ene (Research and Technology)
Mihai-Sorin Stănescu/Crin Antonescu (Youth and Sport)
Bogdan Niculescu-Duvăz/Ioan Mureșan (Relation with Parliament)
Ákos Birtalan (Tourism)

Minister-Delegates:
Alexandru Herlea (European Integration)
Remus Opriș (Local Administration)
Valentin Ionescu (Privatization)
Radu Boroianu/Sorin-Mircea Bottez (Public Information)
György Tokay (National Minorities)

Cabinets of Romania
1996 establishments in Romania
1998 disestablishments in Romania
Cabinets established in 1996
Cabinets disestablished in 1998